The Régiment de La Marine was an infantry regiment of the Kingdom of France created in 1635, later being designated as 11th Infantry Regiment

Equipment

Regimental Colors

12 regimental colors out of which 1 "white" Colonel, and 11 of Ordinance «blue and green by opposition, white cross ».

See also
Troupes de la marine

References

Military units and formations established in 1635
Military units and formations disestablished in 1793
Line infantry regiments of the Ancien Régime